South Waterfront Park is a  park in Portland, Oregon, United States. The park was acquired in 1999.

See also
 List of parks in Portland, Oregon

References

1999 establishments in Oregon
Parks in Portland, Oregon
Protected areas established in 1999
South Portland, Oregon